Víctor Samuel Turcios Pacheco (born April 13, 1988 in La Unión) is a retired Salvadoran footballer who last played for Alianza F.C.

Club career
Nicknamed El Tiburón (the Shark), Turcios started his career at Atlético Balboa in 2005 and moved to Luís Ángel Firpo before the 2009 Clausura. In December, 2011 Turcios signed a two-year contract with Águila.

Finland
On February 16, 2012, it was confirmed Turcios would sign with Ykkönen side RoPS from Finland.  He made his league debut in a 2-0 victory over Viikingit. On August 25, he suffered a strained ligament in his right knee that would keep him out for approximately 6 months. He was a key member in helping his team gain promotion to the Veikkausliiga to play in the 2013 season. He and the club mutually terminated his contract in January 2014.

Match-fixing ban
On September 20, 2013, Turcios was banned for 6 months due to his involvement with match fixing.

International career
Turcios made his debut for El Salvador in an October 2007 friendly match against Costa Rica and has, as of February 2012, earned a total of 29 caps, scoring 1 goal. He has represented his country in 6 FIFA World Cup qualification matches and played at the 2011 UNCAF Nations Cup, as well as at the 2009 and 2011 CONCACAF Gold Cups.

International goals

Honours and awards

Club

RoPS
Ykkönen: 2012
Suomen Cup: 2013 Finnish Cup

References

External links
 Turcios: “Prometo trabajo y entrega en la cancha”(Interview) - El Gráfico 

1988 births
Living people
People from La Unión Department
Association football central defenders
Salvadoran footballers
El Salvador international footballers
2009 CONCACAF Gold Cup players
2011 Copa Centroamericana players
2011 CONCACAF Gold Cup players
2013 CONCACAF Gold Cup players
Veikkausliiga players
Atlético Balboa footballers
C.D. Luis Ángel Firpo footballers
Rovaniemen Palloseura players
Alianza F.C. footballers
Salvadoran expatriate footballers
Expatriate footballers in Finland
Sportspeople involved in betting scandals
El Salvador under-20 international footballers
El Salvador youth international footballers